The Archdeacon of Manchester is a senior ecclesiastical officer in the Church of England in Greater Manchester.

The archdeaconry of Manchester, unusually, was established (on 29 September 1843) a few years before the Diocese of Manchester (on 1 September 1847.) The archdeaconry was therefore initially, for the time being, established in the Diocese of Chester.

List of archdeacons

References

Sources

Lists of Anglicans
 
Archdeacons of Manchester
1843 establishments in England